Tanvin Sweety (born 30 August) is a Bangladeshi television, stage and film actress and model. As of 2005, she acted in more than a hundred television plays.

Early life and career

In 1991, Sweety began her modeling career with Afzal Hossain's Diamond Brand.

Sweety joined a theater troupe called Theatre Group. She acted in stage plays including "Meraj Fakirer Ma", "Payer Awaaj Pawa Jaye", "Spordha", "Tomrai", "Ekhono Kritodash" and "Mukti". She debuted in television acting in the drama "Godhuli Logone". She also acted in "Shundori", "Chhoto Chhoto Dheu", "Jomila", "Dokanir Bou", "Haradhoner Naat-Jamai" and "Rupali Nodir Dheu". She acted in the film Banshi (2006) directed by Abu Sayeed.

Sweety also produced television dramas. Her production house is called Shonkhochil.

Personal life
Sweety is married to Ripon. Her father was Abdul Motalib.

References

External links

Living people
Bangladeshi film actresses
Bangladeshi stage actresses
Bangladeshi television actresses
Year of birth missing (living people)